The 1930 Stanford football team represented Stanford University in the 1930 college football season. Their head coach was Pop Warner in his seventh season. Stanford played its home games at Stanford Stadium in Stanford, California.

On November 25, shortly before the team's final game against Dartmouth, a unanimous vote of the Executive Committee for the Associated Students chose "Indians" as the official mascot of Stanford's sports teams. "Indians" had been in use informally, but the vote formalized the use over "Cards" and "Cardinals", which were considered "not symbolical of Stanford spirit as that of 'Indians.'"

Schedule

References

Stanford
Stanford Cardinal football seasons
Stanford football